Stenophysa marmorata is a species of air-breathing freshwater snail, an aquatic gastropod mollusk in the family Physidae.

Distribution 
This species occurs in the Lesser Antilles on Dominica. and St. Vincent

References 

 Robart, G., Mandahl-Barth, G. & Ripert, C. (1977). Inventaire, repartition geographique et ecologie des mollusques dulcaquicoles d'Haiti (Caraibes). Haliotis. 8: 159-171.

External links 
 Guilding, I. (1828). Observations on the zoology of the Caribbean Islands. The Zoological Journal. 3: 527-544
 Sowerby, G. B. I. (1821-1834). The genera of recent and fossil shells, for the use of students, in conchology and geology. Published in 42 numbers. Vol. 1, pls 1-126 
 Sowerby, G. B. II. (1873-1874). Monograph of the genus Physa. In: Conchologia iconica, or illustrations of the shells of molluscous animals, vol. 19, pls 1-12 and unpaginated text. L. Reeve, London. 
 Villa, A. & Villa, J. B. (1841). Dispositio systematica conchyliarum terrestrium et fluviatilium quae adservantur in collectione fratrum Ant. et Jo. Bapt. Villa. Conspectu abnormitatum novarumque specierum descriptionibus adjectis. 62 pp. (+ 2 pp. Resumptus numeralis specierum + Errata).
 aylor, D. W. (2003). Introduction to Physidae (Gastropoda: Hygrophila); biogeography, classification, morphology. Revista de Biología Tropical. 51(Suppl. 1): 1-263 (includes a Catalog of species, pp. 197-263).
  Paraense, W. L. (1986). Physa Marmorata Guilding, 1828 (Pulmonata: Physidae). Memórias do Instituto Oswaldo Cruz. 81(4): 459-469
 Appleton C. C. & Dana P. (2005). "Re-examination of Physa mosambiquensis Clessin, 1886 and its relationship with other Aplexinae (Pulmonata: Physidae) reported from Africa". African Invertebrates 46: 71–83. abstract

Physidae
Gastropods described in 1828